The  was a limited express train service in Japan operated by East Japan Railway Company (JR East) which ran between  and  via the Ōu Main Line. The service was discontinued from December 2010.

Service pattern
There were three services in each direction daily.

Rolling stock
Trains were normally formed of three-car 485 series EMUs based at Akita depot, sometimes strengthened to six cars during busy seasons. Green car (first class) accommodation was included in car 1.

The trains were formed as follows, with car 1 at the Akita end.

History

This service was discontinued from the start of the revised timetable on 13 March 1988.

The Kamoshika name was revived from March 1997 as a limited express service operating between Akita and Aomori, replacing the former Tazawa limited express service which ran between Morioka and Aomori via Akita before the Akita Shinkansen was opened.

See also
 List of named passenger trains of Japan

References

External links

 JR East 485 series "Kamoshika" 

Named passenger trains of Japan
East Japan Railway Company
Railway services introduced in 1986
Railway services discontinued in 2010